Josh Adams may refer to:

 Josh Adams (comics) (born 1987), American comic book and commercial artist
 Josh Adams (American football) (born 1996),  American football player in the NFL for the New York Jets
 Josh Adams (basketball) (born 1993), professional basketball player
 Josh Adams (rugby union) (born 1995), Welsh rugby union winger

See also
 Joshua Adams (born 1986), Australian Dancesport competitor